Marol is a locality in the suburb of the Andheri (East) in Mumbai, India.

History
The area has been inhabited for centuries, successively coming under both Portuguese and British rule.

The village is filled with the Dawoodi Bohra community. They have their own residential park and have societies lined through the roads of the village. A separate hill, Burhani Hill is also present for residential purposes, all exclusive for Dawoodi Bohras. They have their own separate masjid named Saifee Masjid, which was the host for the annual congregation of Moharram in 2009, held by His Holiness Syedna Mohammed Burhanuddin. In 2013, Syedna Mohammed Burhanuddin established bohra community's fourth branch of Aljamea-tus-Saifiyah, the Arabic academy in Marol.

Geography
Marol consists of the areas Marol village, Marol Naka, Marol Pipeline, Marol Depot, Marol Maroshi Bus Station, Military Road, Bhavani Nagar, Vijay Nagar, Marol Police Camp, parts of JB Nagar and parts of Marol MIDC. It is near to the international airport. The Marol-Maroshi Road stretches from Marol Naka up to Maroshi Naka (in Aarey colony), beyond which is the Picnic Spot. Marol Mapkhan Nagar and the Marol Church Road are the two diversions, the latter one also leads to Marol Pipeline.

Marol Village is  home to a large number of Christians, with the St. John the Evangelist Church which has been established since 1579  and its high school.

Marol Fire Brigade is at Marol Naka.

Police Camp is at the end of Marol and is home to the families of people working for the Maharashtra Police. It is mainly the base camp for the State Armed Constabulary. It also has a Police Training Centre where police recruitment is held and newly recruited officers receive their training.

The oldest housing colony in the area is a group of 11 buildings on Military Road called Blossom Society. The first occupants arrived here in 1968.

Transport

Roads
Marol is strategically located close to the Western Express Highway and in close proximity to Andheri railway station. Located off the Andheri-Kurla and Andheri-Ghatkopar link roads, it has good east–west connectivity.

Buses

There is excellent bus connectivity to all parts of the city of Mumbai.

Railway
Marol also has close and easy links to Mumbai's three suburban railway lines  - Andheri (Western), Ghatkopar (Central) and Kurla (Central/Harbour).

Metro
Marol is currently served by the Marol Naka station on Line 1 of the Mumbai Metro. It will also be served by a station on Line 3 which is under construction.

Airport
The Terminal 2 (locally referred to as the International/ Sahar terminal) of Chhatrapati Shivaji International Airport is situated 1.4 km from Marol Naka.

Rickshaw
Rickshaws are very seamlessly used & are an integral part of Marol. In order to commute to nearby places or far off places in Mumbai, Rickshaws are extensively used.

References

Neighbourhoods in Mumbai